Robert John Duffy (July 5, 1922June 11, 1978) was an American professional basketball player. He played in the Basketball Association of America during the league's inaugural 1946–47 season. He played high school basketball at Saint Charles Preparatory School in Columbus, Ohio, college basketball at Tulane, and in the BAA he split his season playing for the Chicago Stags and Boston Celtics.

As a senior at Tulane in 1942–43, he led the Southeastern Conference with a 16.6 points per game scoring average.

BAA career statistics

Regular season

References

External links

1922 births
1978 deaths
American men's basketball players
Basketball players from Columbus, Ohio
Boston Celtics players
Chicago Stags players
Forwards (basketball)
Tulane Green Wave men's basketball players
Undrafted National Basketball Association players